"I Wish I Was Someone Better" is the sixth single by English alternative rock band Blood Red Shoes. It was released on V2 Records on 29 October 2007, available on 7" vinyl or as a digital download via iTunes, and appears on the band's album Box of Secrets. Upon release, the single reached #186 in the UK Singles Chart.

The song's monochrome music video was directed by Ben Rollason. It is a prototypical example of the controlled, riff-based rock music that Blood Red Shoes are reputable for. In contrast, the B-Side for the single, "The Way It Goes", is a more sedate song that is based entirely on overlapping vocal tracks.

Track listing

7" 
 "I Wish I Was Someone Better" 
 "The Way It Goes"

Personnel 
Laura-Mary Carter – guitar, vocals
Steven Ansell – drums, vocals

References

2007 singles
2007 songs
V2 Records singles